Daniele Galloppa (born 15 May 1985) is an Italian football manager and a former player who played as a midfielder. He is the manager of Santarcangelo in Serie D.

Although he was usually deployed as a central midfielder, he was also capable of playing as a left winger. Despite his ability and reputation as a promising prospect in Italian football, he has struggled with several injuries throughout his career.

Club career

Roma
In August 2006 Galloppa was loaned to Serie A club Ascoli.

Siena
On 30 January 2007, Galloppa was loaned to A.C. Siena. On 17 February 2007, he played his first club match for Siena against Milan.

Galloppa was sold to Siena on 9 July 2007, in a co-ownership deal for €1.1 million. In June 2008 Siena signed the remain 50% registration rights of Galloppa for €1.75 million; 50% registration rights of Gianluca Curci for €1.75 million; Roma signed keeper Artur for €750,000, Simone Loria for €2.8 million in exchange. Thus only €50,000 cash was involved.

Parma
On 26 June 2009, Galloppa left Siena to join Parma in a co-ownership deal, for €5 million. Parma also signed Manuel Coppola for €3 million and Siena signed Francesco Parravicini for €2.5 million and half of the registration rights of Reginaldo for €2.5 million. This only €3 million cash was involved in the mega swap deals.

Galloppa instantly became a fixture in a newly promoted side that finished in an excellent seventh position in the 2009–10 season. In June 2010 the co-ownership between Parma and Siena on Galloppa and Reginaldo were renewed. The following season was disrupted by an anterior cruciate ligament injury to his left knee he sustained in a pre-season friendly against Shakhtar Donetsk on 10 August 2010, which kept him out until January 2011; as a result Galloppa was able to make only 11 appearances (six as a substitute) all season. Nevertheless, his registration was bought outright by Parma in June 2011. Parma signed him for the pre-agreed price of €5 million, which Siena got Reginaldo also for the pre-agreed price of €2.5 million as well as full registration rights of Ângelo for €2.5 million, which a year before was a free agent.

On 21 October 2012, Galloppa injured the cruciate ligament of his left knee once again in a league match against Sampdoria, which ruled him out for the remainder of the season; he returned to action in the summer of 2013, in time for Parma's summer training camp. On 31 July 2013, Galloppa injured himself in a friendly match against Marseiille, rupturing the anterior cruciate ligament of his right knee. He returned to action for the final match of the 2013–14 season. The next season, Galloppa made 19 appearances for Parma.

Modena
Following Parma's bankruptcy, on 8 September 2015 Galloppa was signed by Serie B club Modena F.C., joining Hernán Crespo at the side, who had previously coached him at Parma. After making 15 appearances during the first half of the 2015–16 season, on 7 February 2016, Galloppa suffered yet another injury to the cruciate ligament of his right knee in a 0–0 home draw against Cesena, which ruled him out for the remainder of the season; this was his fourth major knee injury in five years.

International career
Galloppa was a member of the Italy U20 squad at the 2005 FIFA World Youth Championship. He scored two goals in the tournament, one in Italy's final match of the group stage on 18 June, a 4–1 win against Canada, and one in a 3–1 win against the United States in the round of 16, on 21 June, as Italy reached the quarter-finals of the tournament, only to lose to Morocco on penalties; Galloppa missed Italy's first penalty in the resulting shoot-out. He was later also capped for the Olympic U21 team at the 2008 Toulon Tournament, which the Italians proceeded to win.

On 6 June 2009, Galloppa made his senior national team debut in a friendly match in Pisa against Northern Ireland, coming on as a substitute in the 3–0 win. He made his second appearance for Italy later that year, in a 1–0 friendly home win against Sweden in Cesena, on 18 November.

Coaching career
He became the assistant coach with Santarcangelo late in the 2017–18 season. Following club's relegation to Serie D for the 2018–19 season, he was promoted to the head coach position on 13 August 2018.

References

External links

FIGC profile  

1985 births
Footballers from Rome
Living people
Italian footballers
Italy youth international footballers
Italy under-21 international footballers
Italy international footballers
Association football midfielders
A.S. Roma players
U.S. Triestina Calcio 1918 players
Ascoli Calcio 1898 F.C. players
A.C.N. Siena 1904 players
Parma Calcio 1913 players
Modena F.C. players
U.S. Cremonese players
Carrarese Calcio players
Serie A players
Serie B players
Serie C players
Italian football managers